Dzoragyugh or Dzoragyukh may refer to:
Dzoragyugh, Gegharkunik, Armenia
Dzoragyugh, Aragatsotn, Armenia
Dzoragyugh, Lori, Armenia